Biomphalaria kuhniana is a species of air-breathing freshwater snail, an aquatic pulmonate gastropod mollusk in the family Planorbidae, the ram's horn snails.

Shell description 
All species within the family Planorbidae have sinistral shells.

Distribution 
Dominica.

Phylogeny 
A cladogram showing the phylogenic relationships of species within the genus Biomphalaria:

References

Biomphalaria
Gastropods described in 1883